Motorcycle Live is an annual motorcycle and scooter show held at the National Exhibition Centre in Birmingham, England.

History
The event first started in 1981 as the International Motorcycle and Scooter Show. In 2010 it was renamed Motorcycle Live.

Sponsorship

References

Transport in the United Kingdom